Martin Čížek (born 9 June 1974) is a Czech former professional footballer who played as a midfielder. He spent three seasons in the Bundesliga with TSV 1860 Munich and SpVgg Unterhaching.

Honours
Baník Ostrava
 Gambrinus liga: 2003–04
 Czech Cup: 2004–05

External links
 
 

Living people
1974 births
Association football midfielders
Czech footballers
Czech Republic under-21 international footballers
Czech Republic international footballers
Czech First League players
FC Baník Ostrava players
AC Sparta Prague players
TSV 1860 Munich players
SpVgg Unterhaching players
People from Vítkov
Bundesliga players
2. Bundesliga players
Sportspeople from the Moravian-Silesian Region